Geoffrey Hett (5 March 1909 – November 1988) was a British fencer. The son of Walter Hett, a schoolmaster at Brighton College from 1907 to 1944 (headmaster 1939–44), he was educated at Brighton College and Cambridge University. Captain of the Cambridge University fencing team in 1930, he competed in the team foil event at the 1936 Summer Olympics.

References

External links
 

1909 births
1988 deaths
British male fencers
Olympic fencers of Great Britain
Fencers at the 1936 Summer Olympics
People from Marylebone
Sportspeople from London